Send In the Dogs is a British documentary television series about the work of the Metropolitan Police, Greater Manchester Police, West Yorkshire and British Transport Police's police dogs.  The first series of four episodes aired on ITV from 15 July to 5 August 2008. The show was renewed the following year, and a second series of eight episodes aired on ITV from 21 July to 8 September 2009.

Send In The Dogs currently airs on Sky channels Sky One, Sky Witness, Sky Crime and Pick.

Related Shows
Send In the Dogs Australia

References

2008 British television series debuts
2009 British television series endings
British crime television series
Documentary television series about policing
ITV documentaries
Television shows about dogs
Dogs in the United Kingdom